The Tercera Catalana is the 8th tier of the Spanish football league system and the third highest league in the autonomous community of Catalonia. The league was formed in 2011 to replace the Segona Territorial as third level of Catalonia and was split into 17 groups.

Structure 
Territorially, groups are divided as following:

Group 1 - Terres de l'Ebre
Group 2 and 3 - Rest of the Province of Tarragona
Group 4, 5, 6, 7, 8, 9, 10, 11 and 12 - Province of Barcelona
Group 13 and 14 - Province of Lleida
Group 15, 16 and 17 - Province of Girona

See also 
 Primera Catalana
 Segona Catalana
 Divisiones Regionales de Fútbol

References

Catalan football competitions
Catalana